Eupterote is a genus of moths in the family Eupterotidae. It was first described by Jacob Hübner in 1820.

Species
 Eupterote acesta Swinhoe, 1894
 Eupterote alba (Swinhoe, 1892)
 Eupterote amaena Walker, 1855
 Eupterote asclepiades (Felder, 1874)
 Eupterote balwanti Bhasin., 1946
 Eupterote calandra Swinhoe, 1894
 Eupterote celebica Nässig, Holloway & Beeke, 2011
 Eupterote chinensis Leech, 1898
 Eupterote citheronia Bryk, 1944
 Eupterote citrina Walker, 1855
 Eupterote crinita Swinhoe, 1899
 Eupterote decolorata (Grünberg, 1914)
 Eupterote diffusa Walker, 1865
 Eupterote dulcinea Swinhoe, 1901
 Eupterote epicharis West, 1932
 Eupterote fabia (Cramer, 1780)
 Eupterote flavicollis Guérin-Méneville, 1843
 Eupterote flavida Moore, 1884
 Eupterote formosana Matsumura, 1908
 Eupterote geminata (Walker, 1855)
 Eupterote glaucescens (Walker, 1855)
 Eupterote harmani Holloway, 1987
 Eupterote hibisci Fabricius, 1775
 Eupterote kageri Nässig, 1989
 Eupterote kalliesi Nässig, 2000
 Eupterote lineosa Walker, 1855
 Eupterote liquidambaris Mell, 1930
 Eupterote minor Moore, 1893
 Eupterote mollifera Walker, 1865
 Eupterote multiarcuata Holloway, 1976
 Eupterote muluana Holloway, 1987
 Eupterote murina (Moore, 1877)
 Eupterote naessigi Holloway, 1987
 Eupterote nigriceps (Hampson, 1893)
 Eupterote nobilis (Bryk, 1944)
 Eupterote obsoleta (Talbot, 1926)
 Eupterote orientalis Fabricius
 Eupterote pallida (Walker, 1855)
 Eupterote pandya (Moore, [1866])
 Eupterote patula (Walker, 1855)
 Eupterote petola Moore, 1860
 Eupterote placida (Moore, [1883])
 Eupterote plumipes (Walker, 1855)
 Eupterote radiata (Walker, 1866)
 Eupterote rothschildi (Strand, 1924)
 Eupterote splendens Nässig & C.H. Schulze, 2007
 Eupterote subcurvifera (Walker, 1865)
 Eupterote testacea Walker, 1855
 Eupterote todara Moore, 1884
 Eupterote translata Swinhoe, 1885
 Eupterote udiana Moore, 1860
 Eupterote undans Walker, 1855
 Eupterote undata Blanchard, 1844
 Eupterote unicolor Hampson, 1891
 Eupterote vialis Moore, 1879
 Eupterote weberi (Holloway, 1976)

Former species
 Eupterote collaris (Guérin-Méneville, 1843)
 Eupterote doddi Turner, 1911
 Eupterote expansa (Lucas, 1891)
 Eupterote jaresia Swinhoe, 1904
 Eupterote niassana (Rothschild, 1917)
 Eupterote punctata Joicey & Talbot, 1916

References

 , 1989: A new species of the genus Eupterote Hübner [1822] from Sumatra (Lepidoptera, Eupterotidae). Heterocera Sumatrana 2 (7): 169–174. 
 , 2000: A new and remarkable species of Eupterote from the mountains of West Sumatra (Lepidoptera: Eupterotidae). Heterocera Sumatrana 12 (2): 67–77. Full article: .
 ,  & , 2011: Description of a new species of Eupterote (Eupterote) from Sulawesi (Indonesia) (Lepidoptera: Eupterotidae). Nachrichten des Entomologischen Vereins Apollo NF 31 (4): 197–200.
 , 2007: A second species with diurnal males of the genus Eupterote from Indonesia: Eupterote (Eupterote) splendens sp. n. from Sulawesi (Insecta, Lepidoptera, Bombycoidea, Eupterotidae). Senckenbergiana Biologica 87 (2): 189–194.

External links
Hübner, 1820 . Verz. bekannt. Schmett.: 187

Eupterotinae
Macrolepidoptera genera